Scandal Sheet may refer to:
 Scandal sheet or tabloid journalism, a popular style of largely sensationalist journalism
 Scandal Sheet (1931 film), an American crime film starring George Bancroft
 Scandal Sheet (1939 film), an American crime film
 Scandal Sheet (1952 film), an American black-and-white film by Phil Karlson
 Scandal Sheet (1985 film), an American TV film starring Burt Lancaster

See also 
 Scandal Street (disambiguation)